Wasala Kulauthum Wijekoon Mudiyanselage Duleeka Kumari Wijekoon Marapana commonly as Duleeka Marapana (born 15 November 1975), is an actress in Sri Lankan stage, television and cinema as well as a public speaker, director, producer and philanthropist. Marapana is best known for the role "Dingiri Amma" in Malee teledrama. Apart from acting, she is the Founder of 3rdbell Productions and Academy, the Chairperson CO CO productions and founder of Northwest films.

Career
Marapana started her acting career in 1997 while in university, starring in various stage dramas. Her most-notable dramas were Sapathnee (best actress), Swarnama (best actress), Katu Yahana (nominated), Sevanali Ha Minissu, House of Bernarda Alba (best supporting actress) Katu Yahana and Upanda Maranaya. 

In 2014 she appeared in her own production of Lawrencege Manamali, alongside her husband Sujeewa Priyal Yaddehige. Their wedding was celebrated during the stage drama performed on 13 and 14 August 2015. The play received huge popularity and has been staged more than 380 shows island-wide.

In Sumathi Awards, Marapana won the Best Actress Award for her role in Depath Nai, Himakatayam, Rathriya, Sudheera, Isuru Bawana, Ridee Ittankaraya, and Me Wasantha Kalayai. After that, her most-popular role "Dingiri Amma" came through the teledramas Malee and Aththamma.  For both serials, she won People's Award two times. In 2019, she appeared in the popular Sudu Anguru and stage play Lawrencege Manamali. Recently, she appeared in the serials, Internasanal 1 and 2 and  Pork Street.

The actress, who is also actively engaged in environmental conservation and activism, played a lead role in an environmental film Suparna directed by her husband. Apart from that, she acted with critics acclaimed roles in the films such as Sooriya Arana, Kosthapal Punyasoma, Samanala Thatu, Walapatala, Sinhaya and Daruwane.

Notable works

 Acid
 Amarabandu Rupasinghe 
 Aththamma as Dingiri Amma
 Dangakara Tharu
 Depath Nai
 Divithura as Deepika 
 E Brain 
 Ehala Maha Nikinna 
 Eka Iththaka Mal as Kanthi
 Hima Katayam as Damayanthi
 Internasanal 1 & 2 as Disna 
 Isuru Bhawana as Violet Nona
 Kaluwara Anduna
 Kiyadenna Adare Tharam 
 Malee as Dingiri Amma
 Neela Palingu Diya as Ariyawathi
 Pipi Piyum
 Pork Veediya 
 Punchi Walauwwa as Mary Mekhala
 Rathi Virathi
 Rathriya as Sangeetha
 Ridee Ittankaraya as Punchi Menika
 Roda Hatara Manamalaya
 Sabba Sakala Mana
 Sanda Amavakai as Sandamali
 Sandawathaka Waruna
 Sara as Veronica
 Satharadenek Senpathiyo
 Sihina Tawuma 
 Sihinayak Wage
 Sihini as Thalatha
 Sudeera as Shahini Lellawala
 Sudu Anguru as Patta Rani
 Thalaya Soyana Geethaya
 Wes Benduma

Awards
Marapana has won many awards in theater, cinema and television award ceremonies.
 Nominated as best actress for her first tele drama " Sanda Amawakai" 
 Best Actress in Inter-University Drama Festival 1997 (Nizerla)
Best Actress inter-University Drama Festival 1998 (Jeewithe Mithyawa)
 Best Actress National State Short drama festival 1999 – Sapathmee
 Best Actress National State Drama Festival 2000 – Swarnamali ( directed by professor Bandula Jayawardana )
 Best Actress Sumathi Awards 2004 – Depath Nai 
 Best Actress Sumathi Awards 2005 – Hima Katayam(Snow Designs)
 Best Supporting Actress National Teledrama Festival "Rathriya"(Night)
 SIGNIS Best performance of the Year 2007 – Samanala Thatu film( Butterfly wings )
 Best Actress Sumathi Awards 2010 – Ridee Itankaraya
 Best Actress in Raigam Tele'es 2010 – Isuru Bawana
 Best Supporting Actress 2011 – Me Wasantha Kalayai 
 Best Supporting Actress National Drama Festival 2012 – The House of Bernada Alba
 Best Actress in 8th Mass Lanka Film Awards 2013
 SLIIM Nielson Peoples awards 2015 Best Actress 
 SLIIM Nielson Peoples awards 2016 Best Actress

Filmography

References

External links 
 
 Marriage in My Perspective Duleeka Marapana – Silumina
 Duleeka Marapana – Sarasaviya
 Duleeka Marapana – Sarasaviya
 සැබෑ ජීවිතයේ සුජීව වේදිකාවේ ලෝරන්ස්
 දුලීකාගේ විවාහය ගැන කටකතා
 මාරපන එදිරිව අභයකෝන් නඩුවහි කතාව

Living people
1975 births
Sinhalese actresses
Sri Lankan film actresses
Place of birth missing (living people)
Actors from Kandy
Alumni of Hillwood College
Sri Lankan environmentalists
Sri Lankan women environmentalists